Derek Murray Wyatt (born 4 December 1949) is a British politician who served as Member of Parliament (MP) for Sittingbourne and Sheppey from 1997 to 2010, having previously been a councillor in the London Borough of Haringey (1994–95) where he was Chairman of Alexandra Palace.  He played rugby for England.

Early life
Derek was educated at Westcliff County High School (1961–66) & Colchester Royal Grammar School (1966-68). He attended St Luke's College, Exeter (Certificate of Education, 1968–71), the Open University (BA. Hons 2:1 Modern Art and Architecture, 1973–78), he was a mature student at St Catherine's College, Oxford, (Education,1981–82) and King's College, London (MA, International Studies, 2016–18).

Political career 
Wyatt was Member of Parliament (MP) for the new constituency of Sittingbourne and Sheppey (1997-2010) having previously been a councillor in the London Borough of Haringey (1994–95) where he was also Chairman of Alexandra Palace.

He was on the Culture, Media and Sport Select Committee from 1997 to 2005 and the Public Accounts Committee in 2007 before becoming the Parliamentary Private Secretary to the Rt Hon Margaret Hodge MP, Minister for the Arts. In February 2009 he became PPS to Lord Mark Mallock-Brown at the Foreign Office. He chaired six all party committees in the House of Commons. In the votes on Iraq, he voted against intervention.

He won an ISPA Hero's Award (2006) for his work on seeing the Computer Misuse Act onto the statute book.

In the 2005 general election, he won the 3rd smallest majority of any MP, at just 79 votes, after two recounts.

On 1 July 2009, Wyatt announced he would stand down at the 2010 general election.

Sporting career 
Wyatt played rugby for the University of Oxford, the Barbarians and England and stopped a British and Irish Lions Tour to South Africa in 1986 with the help of Archbishop Trevor Huddleston. He was subsequently awarded a Special Commendation by the UNO.

Wyatt played his club rugby for Bedford where his record of 145 tries in 152 games was higher than anyone else in the clubs' history as of 2016. He was later a regular for Bath where he equalled the club try scoring record (29 tries) in his first two seasons. Whilst at Oxford he won a Blue at Rugby, representing Oxford in the varsity match. He was Chairman of the All Party Parliamentary Rugby Union group for 13 years and introduced an annual lecture and an awards dinner. He has recently been made Life President of the club.

Awards 
Whilst the Chair of the Royal Trinity Hospice, Wyatt was Runner Up in the Third Sector Awards 2015 Best Charity Chair UK.

References

External links
 Official Website
 Second Website
 Guardian Unlimited Politics – Ask Aristotle: Derek Wyatt MP
 TheyWorkForYou.com – Derek Wyatt MP
 Open Rights Group – Derek Wyatt MP
 Culture, Media and Sport Committee Press Notice No 1 of Session 2001–02 (23 July 2001)
 BBC Politics page

News items
 Winning New Statesman award in July 2006
 Praising Conservative election campaign in March 2005
 Criticising South East Development Agency in November 2002
 Dealing with internet spam in September 2002
 Calling for free internet access in March 1998

Video clips
 YouTube Channel

1949 births
Living people
Alumni of St Catherine's College, Oxford
Alumni of the Open University
Alumni of the University of Exeter
Barbarian F.C. players
Bath Rugby players
Bedford Blues players
British sportsperson-politicians
Councillors in the London Borough of Haringey
England international rugby union players
English rugby union players
Labour Party (UK) MPs for English constituencies
Oxford University RFC players
People educated at Colchester Royal Grammar School
Rugby union players from Woolwich
Rugby union wings
UK MPs 1997–2001
UK MPs 2001–2005
UK MPs 2005–2010